Christophe Lambert (born 3 June 1985 in Braunschweig) is a German judoka. He competed at the 2012 Summer Olympics in the -90 kg event and lost in the first round to Elkhan Mammadov. Lambert won the bronze medal at the 2012 European Judo Championships.

References

External links

 
 
 

German male judoka
Living people
Olympic judoka of Germany
Judoka at the 2012 Summer Olympics
Sportspeople from Braunschweig
1985 births
20th-century German people
21st-century German people